In computing, a NetWare File System (NWFS) is a file system based on a heavily modified version of FAT. It was used in the Novell NetWare operating system. It is the default and only file system for all volumes in versions 2.x through 4.x, and the default and only file system for the SYS volume continuing through version 5.x. Novell developed two varieties of NWFS:

 16-bit NWFS 286, used in NetWare 2.x
 32-bit NWFS 386, used in NetWare 3.x through NetWare 6.x.

Novell Storage Services (NSS, released in 1998), superseded the NWFS format.

The NWFS on-disk format was never publicly documented by Novell. The published specifications for 32-bit NWFS are:
 Maximum file size: 4 GB
 Maximum volume size: 1 TB
 Maximum files per volume: 2 million when using a single name space.
 Maximum files per server: 16 million
 Maximum directory entries: 16 million
 Maximum volumes per server: 64
 Maximum volumes per partition: 8
 Maximum open files per server: 100,000
 Maximum directory tree depth: 100 levels
 Characters used: ASCII double-byte
 Maximum extended attributes: 512
 Maximum data streams: 10
 Support for different name spaces: Microsoft Windows Long names (a.k.a. OS/2 namespace), Unix, Apple Macintosh
 Support for restoring deleted files (salvage)
 Support for journaling (Novell Transaction Tracking System a.k.a. TTS)
 Support for block suballocation, starting in NetWare 4.x

For larger files the file system utilized a performance feature named Turbo FAT.

Transparent file compression was also supported, although this had a significant impact on the performance of file serving.

Every name space requires its own separate directory entry for each file. While the maximum number of directory entries is 16,000,000, two resident name spaces would reduce the usable maximum number of directory entries to 8,000,000, and three to 5,333,333.

16-bit NWFS could handle volumes of up to 256 MB. However, its only name-space support was a dedicated API to handle Macintosh clients.

See also 

 List of file systems
 Comparison of file systems
 Transaction-Safe FAT File System

External links 
 Using the Transaction Tracking System

Compression file systems
Disk file systems
Network file systems
Novell NetWare